Madger Antonio Gomes Ajú (born 1 February 1997) is a Spanish footballer who plays for Emirati second tier club Fursan Hispania as a midfielder. He has also represented Spain U18s at international level.

He plays as a central midfielder but can also play as a winger or as a fullback.

Club career

Early career
Gomes made his senior debut for Villarreal CF B in 2013, aged 16. Gomes joined Liverpool from Villarreal in the summer of 2014. After being unable to force his way into the first-team at Liverpool, he was released in 2017.

Leeds United
He signed for Leeds United on three-year deal on 27 June 2017 on a free transfer. On 9 August 2017, he made his first-team debut coming on in the 70th minute in the EFL Cup tie against Port Vale.

He made his first start for the club on 22 August 2017, starting in Leeds' 5–1 EFL Cup victory against Newport County.

Sochaux
On 11 June 2018, Gomes joined French side Sochaux in a permanent move from Leeds for an undisclosed fee.

NK Istra 1961
In January 2019, he moved to NK Istra 1961.

Doncaster Rovers
It was announced on 20 June 2019 that Gomes had been signed on a two-year deal by English League One side Doncaster Rovers. He made 29 appearances without scoring in his first season at Doncaster, and then started the following season by scoring four times in the first five games (his debut goal was against Blackburn Rovers in the EFL Cup at Ewood Park on 29 August 2020), but then made a further 21 appearances without scoring.

Crewe Alexandra
On 4 September 2021, he signed a two-year deal with English League One side Crewe Alexandra, having joined as a free agent. His debut was delayed through illness; he eventually made his first Crewe start in a 2–0 win over Wigan Athletic in an EFL Trophy group stage tie at Gresty Road on 5 October 2021, and his league debut at Fleetwood Town on 16 October 2021. He was released shortly after.

Fursan Hispania
After release from Crewe Alexandra, Madger Gomes signed for UAE First Division League club Fursan Hispania.

International career
Gomes has represented Spain at international level including for Spain U18s.  He is also eligible for the Guinea-Bissau national side.

Career statistics

References

External links

1997 births
Living people
Footballers from Alicante
Spanish footballers
Spain youth international footballers
Association football midfielders
Villarreal CF B players
Liverpool F.C. players
Leeds United F.C. players
FC Sochaux-Montbéliard players
NK Istra 1961 players
Doncaster Rovers F.C. players
Spanish expatriate footballers
Expatriate footballers in England
Spanish expatriate sportspeople in England
Spanish sportspeople of African descent
Spanish people of Bissau-Guinean descent